K Kalyan (born 1 January 1975) is an Indian songwriter and music composer known for his works in Kannada film industry. He is also called as "Premakavi.

Career

K.Kalyan entered the film industry at the age of 17 as a Music director cum lyricist for Kannada movies. He learnt Karnatic classical music under the guidance of Chenna Krishnappa. In the early days, he worked under  music director Hamsalekha.

K.Kalyan has written almost 3000 songs. He as worked with many music directors including Ilayaraja, Hamsalekha, A.R.Rahman, S. P. Balasubrahmanyam, Vijaya Bhaskar, Rajan-Nagendra, Upendra kumar, C. Ashwath, Singeetham Shrinivasa Rao,  Manjula Gururaj,  V. Ravichandran, V. Manohar, Mano Murthy, L.N. Shasthri, Anu Mallik, M M Keeravani, Koti, Deva, S A Rajkumar, Sadhu Kokila, Gurukiran, V. Harikrishna, Arjun Janya, Ravi Basruru, Veer Samarth, S. Narayan, R.P Patnayak, Santhosh Narayanan, Rajesh Ramanath, Ajanish Lokanath, Abhiman Roy, Sangeetha Raja, Shyam, Anoop Seelin, Anup Rubens, Bharathwaj, Chakri, Dhina, Imman, Jassie Gift, Joshua Sridhar, Mani Sharma, M.N Krupakar and others

Filmography

Songwriter

Nammoora Mandara Hoove
Amrutha Varshini
Appu
Abhi
Aakash
Kotigobba
Aa Dinagalu
Tananam Tananam
Preethi Prema Pranaya
 Anjaniputra
 Rudra Tandava
Ninnindale
Bhajarangi
Maanikya
Gajakesari
Sarkari Hi. Pra. Shaale, Kasaragodu, Koduge: Ramanna Rai
 Kurukshetra
 Jai Maruthi 800
 Bhajarangi 2
 Jugaari
 Swayam Krushi
Gowdru Hotel''
Vajrakaya
Rana Vikrama
Onti 
Jhansi I.P.S
Rathnan Prapancha

Composer
Chandramukhi Pranasakhi (1999)
Shrirasthu Shubhamasthu (2000)
Rowdy Aliya (2004)
Tananam Tananam (2006)
Manasugula Mathu Madhura (2007)

Honours and awards

Karnataka State Film Awards

References

1975 births
Living people
Kannada-language lyricists
Indian male songwriters
Kannada-language writers
Kannada film score composers
Film musicians from Karnataka
20th-century Indian composers
20th-century male musicians